Gaadhiffushi (Dhivehi: ގާދިއްފުށި) is one of the inhabited islands of Thaa Atoll.

Geography

Demography

References

Islands of the Maldives